The Mohammad Al-Amin Mosque, also referred to as the Blue Mosque, is a Sunni Muslim mosque located in downtown Beirut, Lebanon.

In the 19th century, a Zawiya (prayer corner) was built on this site. Decades of preparation to obtain sufficient land adjacent to the old Zawiya led finally to the building of the new mosque. It was inaugurated in 2008.

Construction 

The Mohammad Al-Amin mosque is the biggest mosque in Lebanon. In the initial steps of building this mosque, Hariri endured many obstacles such as rights of property and funding the actual building. In preparation for the mosque, panels were placed which signified that a mosque was going to be built. Soon after the Lebanon Civil War, very little was left. Following a donation by late Prime Minister Rafic Hariri, the foundation stone for the Mohammad Al-Amin Mosque was laid in November 2002. The design is evocative of the Ottomans’ monumental architecture: with a built area covering approximately 11,000 square meters, a 48-meter-high blue dome and 65-meter-high minarets (placed on the corners of the mosque), the mosque has become a dominant feature of the Beirut City Center skyline. It was inaugurated in 2008. The Mohammad Al-Amin Mosque contains multiple domes. All of the domes of the mosque are made from light blue tiles. The mosque also has multiple arches, which are couple stories high. The mosque has very similar characteristics to the Sultan Ahmed Mosque.

In commencement of the mosque, Hariri commissioned Oger Liban. Hariri also hired Azmi Fakhouri as the main architect for the mosque. After the first stone was laid out for the mosque, the first concrete was poured in 2003. By 2005, the architecture of the mosque began to be built. The main stone used for the mosque was the Yellow Riyadh Stone. While he had other architects and artists to make this mosque, Rafic Hariri was very involved in the making of the building's exterior decor.

Significance of the Zawiya with the Ottoman Empire 
Understanding the role that Muhammad plays in Islam's spread is predominant because he went throughout communities preaching about the revelations given to him and knowledge about this new faith. There are many buildings that are still standing that represent history including the Mohammad Al-Amin mosque that was believed to be named after Muhammad. The Ottoman empire's Ottoman Sultan Abdul Hamid had Shaykh Muhammad Abu Nasr Al-Yafi originally had the mosque named "Zawiya Abu Nasr" and then was later on carrying the name in reference to Muhammad. The Zawiya was given to the sultan for the people of Beirut that were Muslims. The Zawiya is already known to mean the "angle" and could be related to the word "sufism." The similarities between these two words is the history that comes from the nineteenth century and to the year of 1853.

Interior and Exterior Design 

The heightened dome of this mosque is represented just like how many mosques have this common feature. Understanding both the interior and exterior design helps show the significance of the building and how it was formed with a purpose. The formal properties of a building include scale, ornament, materials, topography, routes and light. When looking at the interior details you can see patterned ceilings and a dome circle. The light that is within the building throughout the day comes from the square windows circled around the ceiling in the dome. The ornament that seems to be a chandelier dangles in front of the mihrab and could be used as an extra source of lighting when the sun goes down. As for the scale of this mosque it is surrounded by four minarets that are 65m tall. The height of these surrounding minarets can help with the acoustics because the sound can travel everywhere around so people can hear the Azan.

Timeline 
19th century: A Zawiya (prayer corner) was built on the site of what is today the Al-Amin Mosque, and named after Sheikh Abu Nasr Al-Yafi.
1950: Mohammad Al-Amin Association was created to replace the Zawiya with a mosque.
1975: Souk Abu Nasr and the Zawiya stop operating, following outbreak of the Lebanese Civil War.
November 2002: Foundation stone of the new mosque was laid after a donation by late Prime Minister Rafik Hariri.
2008: Inauguration of the mosque.
2020: The mosque suffers severe damage in the 2020 Beirut explosions.

History 
In the 19th century, a Zawiya (prayer corner) named after Sheikh Abu Nasr al-Yafi was built on this site. Souk Abu Nasr was located in the same area and was operational, with the Zawiya, until 1975. Following earlier efforts by Beiruti families, the Mohammad Al-Amin Association was created in the 1950s in order to replace the Zawiya with a mosque, in the name of Mohammad, and acquire more land. The project never materialized.  It took decades of preparation to obtain sufficient land adjacent to the old Zawiya to build the new mosque. Following a donation by late Prime Minister Rafic Hariri, the foundation stone for the Mohammad Al-Amin Mosque was laid in November 2002. With its built area covering approximately 11,000 square meters, its 48-meter-high blue dome and 65-meter-high minarets, the mosque has become a dominant feature of the Beirut City Center skyline. Inaugurated in 2008, its design is evocative of the Ottomans’ monumental architecture. During the construction of the mosque on this corner of Martyrs’ Square, archaeologists uncovered a large section of the east-west main Roman street (Decumanus Maximus), with paving and columns.
 
The prime minister Rafic Hariri was assassinated on February 14th, 2005 and his body is buried next to the mosque in downtown Beirut, within the Martyr square of Beirut. The mosque was used for the ceremony of the funeral of Hariri. This mosque has been utilized as a symbolic piece of architecture in Lebanon, as it has been the main area of many important political and economical affairs in the country.

The mosque was badly damaged by the Beirut explosions on 4 August 2020. Its chandeliers and windows were shattered, and broken glass fell all over the floor.

See also 
Zawiya
Rafik Hariri
Martyrs' Square
Decumanus Maximus
Sunni Islam in Lebanon

References 

Vloeberghs, Ward (2008) “The Genesis of a Mosque: Negotiating Sacred Space in Downtown Beirut”, European University Institute Working Papers 17, Robert Shuman Center for Advanced Studies, Florence.
Hallaq, Hassan (1987) Al-tarikh alijtima'i wa al-siyasi wa al-iqtisadi fi Bayrut, [Social, Political and Economic History of Beirut], Dar al-Jami'at, Beirut.
Hallaq, Hassan (1987) Bayrut al-mahrousa fil'ahd al-'uthmâni, [Beirut during the Ottoman Period], Dar al-Jami'at Beirut.
Knudsen, Are (December 2016). "Death of a Statesman - Birth of a Martyr". Anthropology of the Middle East. Vol. 11: 1–17 – via Proquest.

External links 

 Mohamad Al Amine Mosque On Google Maps Street View By Paul Saad
 ArchNet info

Mosques completed in 2008
Mosques in Beirut
Mosque buildings with domes
Sunni Islam in Lebanon
Sunni mosques
2020 Beirut explosion